Lividopone is a monotypic genus of ants belonging to the family Formicidae containing the single species Lividopone livida and is endemic to Madagascar.

References

Ants
Monotypic ant genera